A thunderstorm is a storm characterized by the presence of thunder and lightning.

Thunderstorm may also refer to:
 Thunderstorm (band), a heavy metal band
 Thunderstorm (album), a 2000 album by Iron Fire
 Thunderstorm (film), a 1956 British drama film 
 Thunderstorm (play) or Lei Yu, a 1933 play by Cao Yu
 Thunderstorm (opera) or Lei Yu, a 2001 Chinese-language western-style opera by composer Mo Fan based on Cao Yu's play
 The Thunderstorm or Lei Yu, a 1957 Hong Kong film co-starring a young Bruce Lee in a non-fighting role
 Thunderstorms and Neon Signs, a 1995 album by Wayne Hancock

See also
 Electrical storm (disambiguation)
 Storm (disambiguation)
 Thunder (disambiguation)